Simon Wright  may refer to:
 Simon Wright (musician)  (born 1963), English drummer (ex-AC/DC drummer)
 Simon Wright (politician), British Liberal Democrat politician, Member of Parliament for Norwich South 2010-15
 Simon Wright (restaurateur),  broadcaster and food writer
 Simon Wright, supporting character in Captain Future